Orullian is a surname. Notable people with the surname include:

B. LaRae Orullian (born 1933), American banker and civic leader
Peter Orullian (born 1969), American fantasy author and musician